The Big Yellow Group is a self-storage company based in Bagshot, England.  It is the largest self-storage company in the United Kingdom and is a constituent of the FTSE 250 Index and listed on the London Stock Exchange.  Big Yellow has the highest brand awareness in the sector.

History
Founded in 1998 by Nicholas Vetch, Philip Burks and James Gibson, the company has, as of 2021, 104 storage sites in UK, 19 of which operate under the name Armadillo Self Storage. Philip Burks served as the property director of the company from 1998 to 2007.

In 2007, the company was converted into a real estate investment trust and later that year entered into a partnership with funds managed by Pramerica Real Estates Investors to develop another 25 stores in the Midlands, the North of England and Scotland.

In 2003, Graham Coutts sexually assaulted and murdered against Jane Longhurst. Initially he kept the body in his flat in Hove, but then moved it into a storage unit at Big Yellow in Brighton. Unit C50 was permanently sealed as a mark of respect to Jane Longhurst.

Financials

See also 
 Safestore
 Lok'nStore
 Public Storage

References

External links
 

Financial services companies established in 1998
Real estate companies established in 1998
Companies based in Surrey
Companies listed on the London Stock Exchange
Real estate investment trusts of the United Kingdom
British companies established in 1998
Storage companies